The men's 400 metres hurdles at the 2006 European Athletics Championships were held at the Ullevi on August 9 and August 10.

Iakovákis and Plawgo were well ahead of the field, while Williams surged towards the finish line and pipped Frenchman Naman Keïta by a hundredth.

Medalists

Schedule

Results

Semifinals
First 2 in each heat (Q) and the next 2 fastest (q) advance to the Final.

Final

External links
Results

Hurdles 400
400 metres hurdles at the European Athletics Championships